Gabriel Alix (1930–1998) was a Haitian painter. A native of Saint-Marc, Alix was a member of the Centre d'Art and painted still lifes, religious subjects, and animals.

References

 

1930 births
1998 deaths
20th-century Haitian painters
20th-century Haitian male artists
Haitian male painters